Lipjan or Lipljan  is a town and municipality located in the Pristina District of Kosovo. According to the 2011 census, the town of Lipjan has 6,870 inhabitants, while the municipality has 57,605 inhabitants.

Name 
The town's name derives from Ulpiana, the Dardanian and Roman era settlement that preceded Lipjan, possibly due to either a Ul- to Li- shift seen elsewhere in Roman toponyms. Selami Pulaha states that the shift from Ulpiana to Lipjan is in accordance with early Albanian phonetic rules, and must therefore have been inhabited by Albanians to reach its current form. The same theory is supported by Noel Malcolm and van Wijk. It has also been connected with the Albanian term "ujk" ("wolf") (Old and Dialectal Albanian: "ulk") and the name of the city of Ulqin probably delivers from the same variation.

The Roman city of Ulpiana was located near Lipjan and it was named in honor of the Roman Emperor Marcus Ulpius Nerva Traianus. In the early Middle Ages in was part of the Bulgarian Empire and a diocese of the Bulgarian Patriarchate. The neo-Latin form Lypenion for the city occurs for the first time in a Byzantine text from 1018 AD that confirmed the town as an episcopal seat of the Bulgarian Archbishopric of Ohrid following the Byzantine conquest of Bulgaria in the same year.

Geography
The Municipality of Lipjan contains 422 km2 of land, and consists of 70 villages. It borders the municipalities of Drenas, Kosovo Polje and Pristina to the north, Mališevo to the west, Novo Brdo and Gjilan to the east and Ferizaj, Suva Reka and Shtime to the south.

History

Early Period 

The ancient predecessor of Lipjan, Ulpiana, was an important city in the Illyrian and Dardanian spheres. By the 2nd century CE, it was the economic, political and culture centre of the province of Dardania. It was situated on a road between ancient Naissus and Lissus. It suffered from barbarian raids, especially the incursion of 517CE, and from a great earthquake that damaged much of Dardania. By the time Justinian I began his restoration of the Byzantine Empire, Ulpiana was in a ruinous condition - after repairing the town, Justinian labelled it Justiniana Secunda. Ulpiana also played an important ecclesiastical role, having had a local bishop present at the Council of Serdica in 347CE and at the Ecumenic Synod of 553CE. Florus and Laurus were said to have settled in Ulpiana. The old Byzantine church in Lipjan serves as a reminder of the ecclesiastical importance the area once held - it continued to hold a bishopric seat in the Bulgarian empire and once again in the Byzantine empire once the region was recaptured.

Middle Ages 
Lipjan is the birthplace of the Albanian noble, Lekë Dukagjini, who was born here in 1410. He was a close friend of the Albanian military commander and ruler, Gjergj Kastrioti Skanderbeg, and a participant in the Albanian League of Lezhë. He was a member of the Dukagjini family, whose principality extended from Northern Albania to modern-day Kosovo.

Kosovo War 
Lipjan was the sight of war crimes during the Kosovo War. Ethnic Albanians were forced out of the area on April 20 by Serb forces, and Albanian residences were looted and burned by said forces. Serbian paramilitary forces were alleged to have shot more than 50 civilians in 3 surrounding villages.

Demographics

According to the last official census done in 2011, the municipality of Lipjan has 57,605 inhabitants. Based on the population estimates from the Kosovo Agency of Statistics in 2016, the municipality has 57,415 inhabitants.

The ethnic composition of the municipality:

Municipality 

 Akllap/Oklap
 Babush i Muhaxherëve/Muhadžer Babuš
 Baicë/Banjica
 Banullë/Bandulić
 Breg i Zi/Crni Breg
 Brus
 Bujan/Bujance
 Bukovicë/Bukovica
 Divlakë/Divljaka
 Dobrajë e Madhe/Velika Dobranja
 Dobrajë e Vogël/Mala Dobranja
 Gadime e Epërme/Gornje Gadimlje
 Gadime e Ulët/Donje Gadimlje
 Gllanicë/Glanica
 Gllavicë/Glavica
 Gllogoc/Glogovce
 Grackë e Vjetër/Staro Gracko
 Grackë e Vogël/Malo Gracko
 Gumnasellë/Guvno Selo
 Hallaç i Madh/Veliki Alaš
 Hallaç i Vogël/Mali Alaš
 Hanroc/Androvac
 Janjevo/Janjevë
 Kleçkë/Klečka
 Kojskë/Konjsko
 Konjuh
 Kraishtë/Krajište
 Krojmir/Krajmirovce
 Leletiq/Laletić
 Lipovica
 Livađe/Livagjë
 Llugaxhi/Lugadžija
 Llugë/Lug
 Magura
 Marec/Marevce
 Medvec/Medvece
 Mirenë/Mirena
 Okosnicë/Okosnica
 Plitkoviq/Plitković
 Poturoc/Poturovce
 Qellapek/Čelopek
 Qyqylagë/Čučuljaga
 Resinoc/Rusinovce
 Ribar i Madh/Veliko Ribare
 Ribar i Vogël/Malo Ribare
 Ruboc/Rabovce
 Rufc i Ri/Novo Rujce
 Rufc i Vjetër/Staro Rujce
 Shalë, Lipjan/Sedlare
 Shisharkë/Šišarka
 Sllovi/Slovinje
 Smallushë/Smoluša
 Teqë/Teća
 Topličane
 Torina/Torinë
 Trbovce/Tërbuc
 Varigoc/Varigovce
 Vërshec/Vrševce
 Vogaçicë/Vogačica
 Vrelo
 Vrellë e Goleshit/Goleško Vrelo
 Zlokućane

See also 
 Municipalities of Kosovo
 Cities and towns in Kosovo
 Populated places in Kosovo
 Staro Gracko massacre

Notes and references 
Notes

References

External links

 OSCE Profile of Lipjan

Municipalities of Kosovo
Cities in Kosovo
 
Illyrian Kosovo